The United Nations Committee on Contributions is a subsidiary body of the United Nations General Assembly that is responsible for advising the General Assembly on the apportionment of UN expenses among member states.

The committee meets annually for three to four weeks, usually in New York in June. These sessions are closed and its meeting records and press releases are not issued.

Mandate 
The United Nations Charter, in Article 17, established that "the expenses of the Organization shall be borne by the Members as apportioned by the General Assembly." As such on 13 February 1946, the General Assembly created a 10-member Committee on Contributions with the mandate to apportion UN expenses among members, make assessments for new members, hear appeals by members for a change of assessment and apply Article 19 in cases of arrears in the payment of assessments.

Membership of the committee was increased in 1968 to 12, then to 13 in 1973 and most recently in 1976 to 18 members.

Members 
The 18 members of the committee are selected by the General Assembly upon the recommendation of the Fifth Committee and on the basis of broad geographical representation, personal qualifications and experience. They serve three years terms that end on the 31 December of their respective term. The following are the current members of the committee.

References

External links 
 Official website

Organizations established in 1946
United Nations General Assembly subsidiary organs